Ester Valerie Noronha (born 12 September 1992), is an Indian actress and playback singer who works in Telugu, Kannada and Konkani-language films. 1000 Abaddalu (2013), Bhimavaram Bullodu (2014) and Lanke (2021) are some of her notable films.

Career 
Noronha, who was a popular name in the Konkani music circuits from the early age of 8, debuted in the Hindi film Baromas under her Guru Saroj Khan's choreography. She was then noticed and cast by film director Teja in his Telugu film 1000 Abaddalu in 2013, and was immediately signed by the prestigious Suresh Productions for their film Bhimavaram Bullodu alongside Sunil. Noronha debuted in Kannada cinema with the film Usirigintha Neene Hattira in 2014.

While still pursuing her B.A in Political Science and Psychology at the University of Mumbai, she appeared in the title song of the Telugu film Garam, alongside hero Aadi, and in the Tamil film Meen Kuzhambum Mann Paanaiyum. She also debuted in Konkani films with the historic blockbuster Noshibacho Khell. Noronha later starred in the Konkani film Sophiya - A Dream Girl which fetched Ester her good recognition.

Noronha sang in a Konkani film Nachom-ia Kumpasar for the song "Meu Amor".

Personal life 
Noronha is a Roman Catholic and traces her roots to the aristocratic family of the Noronha's of Portugal. Her paternal ancestors are said to be Portuguese/Goans who settled in Verna, Goa and eventually moved to Udupi, Karnataka. While her mother is a Mangalorean.

Noronha married Indian singer and rapper Noel Sean in January 2019. They separated in February 2019 due to irreconcilable differences and filed for divorce in June 2019. The couple was granted the divorce in the Court of Law as well the Court of Church (Annulment) in August 2020.

Filmography

Television

Awards 
 Kala Rathna Award by Geethanjali Institute, Mangalore.
 Best Actor - Female by Mandd Sobhan, Mangalore.

References

External links 
 
 Teen Sensation Ester Noronha Begins her Bollywood Career

Living people
Actresses from Mangalore
University of Mumbai alumni
Actresses in Hindi cinema
Actresses in Telugu cinema
Actresses in Konkani cinema
Actresses in Marathi cinema
Actresses in Tamil cinema
Indian film actresses
21st-century Indian actresses
1992 births